The Scene was a short-lived Canadian psychedelic rock band who had a Top 20 hit in their country in 1967 with "Scenes (From Another World)". Some members of the group would later end up in another Canadian rock band, Life.

Background
The Scene were a popular Montreal group. The line-up consisted of Michael Ship on keyboards, Truly Noland on guitar, Danny Zimmerman on bass and Marty Simon on drums. They released a single "Scenes (from Another World)" bw "You're In A Bad Way". The song got to #14 on the RPM Chart on December 2nd, 1967.

Career
Neil Sheppard aka Neil Ship was in New York, where he met Hank Medress and The Tokens, who owned the B.T. Puppy label. He did  some studio work for them. In late 1967, he helped his brother Michael Ship to get a one-off single deal for The Scene, which led to the group recording the psychedelic rock flavored "Scenes (from Another World)" bw "You're in a Bad Way".

Their single was released on B.T. Puppy 533 in 1967. The October 28th issue of RPM Music Weekly confirmed its release.
Referring to The Scene as "a top Montreal group", it was reported by Billboard in the October 21, 1967 issue that "Scenes From Another World" had made its international debut on the B.T. Puppy label. By November 25, the single had entered the RPM Canadian Hits chart at #15. By December 2nd. their single had moved up from #15 to #14. The following week it was at #13. The week after, it was still holding the #13 position.

Break up
After the group broke up, producer, songwriter Neil Sheppard was looking for a group to record his songs. The group Life included three Scene members and was chosen to record for him. They would go on to have a hit with "Hands of the Clock".

Discography

References

Canadian psychedelic rock music groups
B.T. Puppy Records artists